The 1999 PBA Governors Cup Finals was the best-of-7 basketball championship series of the 1999 PBA Governors Cup, and the conclusion of the conference playoffs. The Alaska Milkmen and San Miguel Beermen played for the 74th championship contested by the league as the two successful ballclubs with rich tradition in winning titles battled for the last PBA championship of the 1990s era.

The San Miguel Beermen captured their second straight title of the season with a 4–2 series victory over Alaska Milkmen. The Beermen won their 13th PBA crown and are now the winningest ballclub, tied with the famed Crispa Redmanizers for most titles.

Danny Ildefonso and Danny Seigle shared won on his co-Finals MVP in Governors Cup Finals.

Qualification

Series scoring summary

Games summary

Game 1

Johnny Abarrientos scored a basket with 1.5 seconds remaining forcing overtime at 68-all, in the extension, San Miguel again looked headed for an outright victory after posting a 76–73 lead with 3.3 seconds left. But Danny Ildefonso was slapped with a technical for second motion against Sean Chambers. Abarrientos drilled in the technical free throw, then nailed a jumper over Olsen Racela and the outstretched arms of Lamont Strothers to knot the count at 76-all, and send the game to a second overtime.

Game 2

Game 3

San Miguel took a 55–37 halftime lead and led 82–71, with less than 6 minutes left in the final quarter. Johnny Abarrientos set the tone for Alaska's comeback with a three-point shot to kick off a 17–0 windup by the Milkmen and held the Beermen scoreless to win the game.

Game 4

Lamont Strothers came through with big baskets down the stretch, Strothers' three-point play off rookie Don Allado with 3:32 remaining in the game cool off Alaska's comeback.

Game 5

Game 6

Alaska led 54–53 going into the final quarter, a four straight points by Freddie Abuda, first on a follow up shot on Strothers' miss and then on a backdoor play gave San Miguel a 59–56 edge, both teams had a scoring drought for three and a half minutes until Danny Seigle converted on a three-point play to give the Beermen a six-point cushion, 62–56, back-to-back baskets by Jojo Lastimosa and Kenneth Duremdes trim down the Beermen lead to two, 62–60, time down to 4:51, Danny Seigle has taken over the Beermen' scoring as the game went down to the final two minutes, with the score at 68–66 for San Miguel, Seigle losses the ball resulting to Duremdes converting a basket plus a foul with 1:25 left, Duremdes missed his bonus free throw and the game was tied at 68-all, Seigle was fouled by Duremdes with 1:14 to go and hit his two free throws to give San Miguel a 70–68 lead, a series of errors first with Alaska's Chambers losing the ball and Duremdes called for traveling violation and then Seigle on the next play was called for an advantage foul on Chambers after the ball was strip in his hands, Chambers split his free throw with 38.3 seconds remaining and Alaska got the ball possession after Chambers missed his second free throw, on an inbound play with 26.9 seconds left, Duremdes forces his shot and missed, Seigle was fouled with 7.7 seconds remaining by Duremdes, who was called for his sixth personal foul, Seigle converted on his two free throws to give San Miguel a 72–69 lead, on the final play in the last 5.6 seconds, Johnny Abarrientos eluded his defenders and had an open look from the three-point line but missed as the buzzer sounded, giving San Miguel the victory. Danny Ildefonso and Danny Seigle won on his shared co-Finals MVP and San Miguel capture on his 13th championship title.

Rosters

Broadcast notes

References

External links
PBA official website

1999 PBA season
1999
San Miguel Beermen games
Alaska Aces (PBA) games
PBA Governors' Cup Finals
PBA Governors' Cup Finals